Bioorganic & Medicinal Chemistry is a scientific journal focusing on the results of research on the molecular structure of biological organisms and the interaction of biological targets with chemical agents. It is published by Elsevier, which also publishes the related journal Bioorganic & Medicinal Chemistry Letters.

References

Biochemistry journals
Elsevier academic journals
English-language journals
Medicinal chemistry journals